Maria Milagros "Snooky" Sumayao Serna (born April 4, 1966) is a Filipino actress. Regarded as the “Eternal Star” by local media, she is best known for her  portrayals in Anak ni Waray, Anak ni Biday (1984); Blusang Itim (1986) and Rosa Mistica. 

She is credited for doing a huge amount of film and television work as a Child Superstar in the 1970s to the 1980s and mid 80s-90s as one of the Movie Teen Queens, bankable film and highly acclaimed actress in the Philippines. Just recently, she bagged two international awards - the Jury Award Best Performance and Best Actress Award - at the 11th International Film Festival Manhattan in New York. According to reports Snooky is the first actor to win two major awards at the film festival. 

In the 2000s, she regained more critical acclaim and controversy in Television and Independent Films gearing her to the new film culture. The 1986 film Blusang Itim gave her more commercial success at the box office fill earning her blockbuster leading lady status alongside bankable lead box office man Richard Gomez as her leading man. The following year her fantasy trilogy movie "Rosa Mistica" becomes a phenomenal success giving her the title "Queen of Philippine Fantasy Movies". 

In 1995, she and regal baby Maricel Soriano starred in Reyna Films Inagaw Mo ang Lahat sa Akin, which was credited for a foreign film at the Oscars as a nomination. In 2003, she joined the ensemble cast of actors of film and television Habang Kapiling Ka with Angelika Dela Cruz as a lead actor on the GMA Primetime drama.

Early life

Being the daughter of actors Von Serna and Mila Ocampo, she started acting early in life via her 1970 landmark debut Wanted: Perfect Mother, where she immediately captured the hearts of Filipino audience as a cute, sweet and smart-talking four-year-old. That same year she earned her first acting nomination from FAMAS Awards as Best Child Performer for the film My Little Angel.

Trained by acclaimed director and National Artist, Lino Brocka, Snooky showed promise as dramatic actress and later proved to be a fine one. In 1972, she won her first FAMAS Award as Best Child Actress for the film Sana Mahalin Mo Ako.

Career

Snooky Serna was tapped by Regal Films to play the lead role in the movie, Katorse in 1980. Since she was not ready for mature roles then, she begged off, which eventually made a big star out of newcomer Dina Bonnevie. In her teens, she was launched as one of the original Regal Babies (promotional term coined for group of teen movie stars under contract with Filipino film production giant Regal Films) and groomed as a leading actress in various loveteam-inspired flicks with then heartthrobs Gabby Concepcion and Albert Martinez. She also starred in more daring films like Bata Pa si Sabel (1981), Strangers in Paradise (1983), Experience(1984), Teenage Marriage (1984) and Lilac (1985).
 
She starred in numerous films in the 1980s like Underage, Schoolgirls, Story of Three Loves and Anak ni Waray vs. Anak ni Biday, among others. In February 1986, she was cast in the lead role of the IBC television series Mansyon, which was the most expensive television production at the time. In the same month, she was given her first solo film project, an adaptation of the comic book serial Blusang Itim, which became a box office success. She was also the host of the television shows Always Snooky and Regal Drama Presents: Snooky on ABS-CBN.

As an actress, she tackled roles which earned acting nominations from various award giving bodies. She was also in Kapag Napagod ang Puso (1988) with Christopher de Leon and Inagaw Mo ang Lahat sa Akin (Harvest Home - official Philippine entry to the 1995 Oscars) but unfortunately was snubbed during awards night. Her other major films include Aabot Hanggang Sukdulan (1990), Yesterday, Today & Tomorrow (1986), Hahamakin ang Lahat (1990) with Vilma Santos, the fantasy films Rosa Mistica (1988), and Madonna: Ang Babaing Ahas (1991). It was with Koronang Itim (1994), that she finally won Best Lead Actress from FAMAS and Cebu Archdiocese Media Awards. She has starred in over 80 films from 1970 to 2004.

Snooky was prodded to concentrate on family and motherhood in the late 1990s. Upon her comeback, her works mostly concentrated on TV. Initially, she had a short stint as a newscaster of IBC Express Balita and as a host for IBC-13's magazine show Travel and Trade. More recently, she's been in various top-rating soap operas in rival stations GMA Network and ABS-CBN, notably Marina, Captain Barbell and Habang Kapiling Ka where she again was awarded a best actress trophy for TV drama performance from PMPC in 2003. Her recent films include Anak Ka ng Tatay Mo, Captain Barbell and the still unreleased Bituin, Buwan at Araw with Nora Aunor.

Snooky made a career turnaround during the late 90s when she concentrated on television and became a host of a tele-magazine show over IBC-13. She also became a newsreader over the same network delivering the mid- and early evening news. She also entered the corporate world by accepting the position of AVP for Megaworld Properties, Inc. and even started a film school in Cabanatuan City. But all endeavors were short-lived.

She is seen mostly with GMA Network and ABS-CBN.

Personal life
Serna was married to actor/model Ricardo Cepeda for over 12 years, with their marriage ending in annulment in January 2006. They have two daughters, Sam and Sachi. Her second husband was Nino Mendoza (artist and vocalist of a Filipino Rock band the Blue Jean Junkies) but they have been separated.

Serna has been a member of the religion, Iglesia ni Cristo, since 2011. Her parents Von and Mila are Roman Catholic and former member of Born-again Christian.

Filmography

Film

Television

Awards
INTERNATIONAL FILM FESTIVAL MANHATTAN, NEW YORK, U. S. A. (SPRING 2021)
Best Performance By The Festival Grand Prize Winner
In The Name Of The Mother

Best Actress
In The Name Of The Mother

Nominations

Film

Television

Awards and nominations

References

External links
 Snooky Serna Official Website (in English)
 Snooky Serna Fan Site (in English)

gmanews.tv, Snooky Serna to pursue annulment case

1966 births
Living people
Filipino child actresses
Filipino film actresses
Members of Iglesia ni Cristo
IBC News and Public Affairs people
ABS-CBN personalities
GMA Network personalities
Filipino people of Spanish descent
Filipino women comedians
Filipino television actresses
Actresses from Metro Manila